Strobisia argentifrons is a moth of the family Gelechiidae. It was described by Walsingham in 1910. It is found in Mexico (Tabasco).

The wingspan is about 8 mm. The forewings are dark bronzy brown, with a slight leaden grey sheen at the base, extending to the dorsum below the fold, followed at one-third by an oblique leaden grey costal spot, beyond which are two silvery costal streaks, one at three-fifths, and one before the apex, both tending obliquely outward. The dark brown cilia have a pale line at their base, a rather wider line beyond their middle reaching around their apex. The hindwings are pale bronzy brown, with a reduplicated pale line in the cilia, at the apex only.

References

Moths described in 1910
Strobisia